The 2019 Rugby Africa season experienced significant restructuring and downsizing from the previous two seasons due to the loss of sponsor Kwese Sports. Due to the lack of funding, the previous formats of the Gold, Silver, and Bronze divisions of the Africa Cup were replaced with a revival of the Victoria Cup and a regional West African series.

Men's Tournaments

Victoria Cup

The Victoria Cup was held for the first time since 2011 and featured four nations playing a double round robin. The fixtures between Kenya and Uganda doubled as the two legs of the Elgon Cup.

Matches

West African Series

The Ghana Rugby Football Union organized a regional series for West African nations.

References

2019
2019 rugby union tournaments for national teams
2019 in African rugby union